The AC6000CW is a  diesel electric locomotive built between 1995 and 2001 by GE Transportation. It is among the world's most powerful single-engined diesel locomotives. The locomotive was designed for extremely high horsepower needs, such as pulling heavy coal and ore trains. Most examples were purchased by two railroads: Union Pacific and CSX.

Design and production
The AC6000CW was designed at the height of a horsepower race between the two major locomotive manufacturers, Electro-Motive Division of La Grange, Illinois with the SD90MAC, and GE Transportation of Erie, Pennsylvania with the AC6000CW, in the early to mid 1990s.

GE worked with Deutz-MWM of Germany in 1994 to design and construct the  7HDL engine for the locomotives. The first locomotive with a 7HDL was the "Green Machine" GE 6000, nicknamed for its green paint scheme. The first production models were also built in 1995: CSX Transportation 600-602, and Union Pacific Railroad 7000-7009. All these locomotives were released to their respective owners in late 1996, once GE's testing was complete.

These units were originally intended to be converted to the  7HDL engine after some problems with the 7HDL were solved, but the conversion never occurred. GE calls these units AC6000CW "Convertibles", while UP classifies them as C6044ACs or AC4460CWs.

The AC6000CW ended production in 2001. Union Pacific designates their units as C60AC, CSX as CW60AC and CW60AH.

Service history 

The initial locomotives suffered from various mechanical problems with the most severe being the engine itself. There were major vibration problems which were addressed by increasing the engine mass to lower the resonant frequency. This in turn caused problems with the twin turbochargers. These problems caused GE to push back full production of the new model until 1998. Changes such as stiffer materials and increased engine wall thickness (to increase mass) were in place at full production.

CSX Transportation has re-powered many of their AC6000CW units from 16-7HDL engines to GEVO-16 to make them more reliable and environmentally friendly.

World record 
On June 21, 2001, all eight of the Australian mining company BHP Billiton's Mount Newman railway AC6000s worked together to set the world record for the heaviest and longest train. The record still stands as of 2023.

Operators

 BHP Billiton
 8 units, numbered 6070-6077, built in June and July 1999.
 These are the only AC6000CW's that were exported outside of the United States. They are the most powerful locomotives to have operated in Australia.
 The 8 units were named after towns and locations in the Pilbara region of Western Australia where they operated.
 6070 Port Hedland wrecked and retired in 2011
 6071 Chichester
 6072 Hesta
 6073 Fortescue
 6074 Kalgan
 6075 Newman
 6076 Mount Goldsworthy
 6077 Nimingarra
In 2013/14 these were replaced by EMD SD70ACes. Despite their historical significance, they were eventually scrapped in late 2014 after BHP couldn't find any buyers who were interested in acquiring the locomotives.

 CSX Transportation:
 3 units, numbered 600-602, were built in December 1995.
 114 units, numbered 603-699 and 5000-5016, were built between October 1998 and April 2000.
 600-602 original prime movers replaced with  7FDL16 engines. This is due to these units being pre-production models and mechanical differences between them and the production model. 
 603-699, 5000-5016's original prime movers replaced with  16 cyl. GEVO prime movers and new computer equipment essentially making them ES46ACs. CSX classifies these units as CW46AHs.
5015 and 5016 were both classified as a CW60AH.

 Union Pacific
 10 units, numbered 7500-7509, were built between November 1995 and December 1996. These units were originally numbered 7000-7009. 7000 was the first AC600CW ever built.
 45 units, numbered 7510-7554, were built between July and December 1998.
 25 units, numbered 7555-7579, were built in January 2001.
 All were converted to AC4460CW units and renumbered to 6888-6968.
 Union Pacific Convertibles:
 70 units, numbered 7336-7405, were built between November 1995 and September 1996. These units were renumbered to 7010-7079 to make room for ES44ACs.
 42 units, numbered 7300-7337, 7339, 7340, 7342, and 7344 were built between March and May 1998.

Beginning in 2018, Union Pacific is sending its AC6000CWs to GE for rebuilding. The rebuilt units are classified as C44ACM.

Preservation 
One original AC6000CW, GECX 6002, formerly Union Pacific 7511, was donated by GE to the Lake Shore Railway Museum in North East, Pennsylvania in 2022. It is the first modern AC traction locomotive to enter preservation. The museum noted that the engine was in almost immaculate condition and was put on public display during the Museum's Memorial Day celebration.

References

BHP Billiton diesel locomotives
C-C locomotives
Diesel-electric locomotives of the United States
Diesel locomotives of Western Australia
AC6000CW
Freight locomotives
Railway locomotives introduced in 1995
Standard gauge locomotives of the United States
Standard gauge locomotives of Australia
Diesel-electric locomotives of Australia